Arthur Fuller (9 August 1880 – 27 September 1947) was a New Zealand cricketer. He played in nine first-class matches for Canterbury from 1917 to 1924.

See also
 List of Canterbury representative cricketers

References

External links
 

1880 births
1947 deaths
New Zealand cricketers
Canterbury cricketers
Cricketers from Christchurch